Ponerorchis kinoshitae is a species of flowering plant in the family Orchidaceae, native to the south Kuril Islands and northern Japan (Hokkaido, north Honshu).

Taxonomy
The species was first described in 1903 by Tomitaro Makino as Gymnadenia keiskei var. kinoshitae. In 1909, he raised it to a full species as Gymnadenia kinoshitae. It was later transferred to other genera, including Orchis and Amitostigma.  A molecular phylogenetic study in 2014 found that species of Amitostigma, Neottianthe and Ponerorchis were mixed together in a single clade, making none of the three genera monophyletic as then circumscribed. Amitostigma and Neottianthe were subsumed into Ponerorchis, with this species becoming Ponerorchis kinoshitae.

References

kinoshitae
Flora of the Kuril Islands
Flora of Japan
Plants described in 1903